Mizanul Haque (died 27 August 2021) was a Bangladesh Awami League politician who served as Member of Parliament of Kishoreganj-4.

Career 
Haque was elected to parliament from Kishoreganj-4 as a Bangladesh Awami League candidate in 1991 and June 1996. In 2005, he appeared in court wearing a funeral shroud.

Death 
Haque died on 27 August 2021 at Shahid Syed Nazrul Islam Medical College in Kishoreganj, Bangladesh.

References 

1945 births
2021 deaths
People from Kishoreganj District
Awami League politicians
5th Jatiya Sangsad members
7th Jatiya Sangsad members